This article lists diplomatic missions resident in Bulgaria. At present, the capital city of Sofia hosts 70 embassies.

This listing excludes honorary consulates.

Diplomatic missions in Sofia

Embassies

Other posts in Sofia 
 (Delegation)
 (Liaison office)
 (Representative office)

Gallery

Consulates General / Consulates

Burgas

Plovdiv

Ruse

Varna

Non-resident embassies accredited to Bulgaria 

Resident in Belgrade, Serbia:

 
 
 
 

Resident in Berlin, Germany:

   
 
 
 
 
 
 

Resident in Bucharest, Romania:

 
 
 
 
 
 
 
 
 
 
 

Resident in Moscow, Russia:

 
 
 
 
 
 
 
 
 
 
 
 

Resident in Rome, Italy:

 
 
 
 
 

Resident in Vienna, Austria:

 
 
 
 

Resident in Warsaw, Poland:

 
 
 
 

Resident in other cities:

  (Andorra la Vella)
  (Athens)
  (Ankara)
  (Geneva)
  (Brussels)
  (Prague)
  (Budapest)
  (Geneva)
  (Ankara)
  (Tel Aviv)
  (Valletta)
  (Budapest)
  (Brussels)
  (Athens)
  (Athens)
  (Budapest)
  (Tel Aviv)
  (City of San Marino)
  (Brussels)
  (Stockholm)
  (London)
  (Ankara)
  (Paris)

Closed missions

See also 
 Foreign relations of Bulgaria
 Visa requirements for Bulgarian citizens

Notes

References

External links 
 Bulgarian Ministry of Foreign Affairs

Foreign relations of Bulgaria
Bulgaria
Diplomatic missions